Exegetia is a genus of moths in the family Lyonetiidae.

Species
 Exegetia crocea  Braun, 1918

External links
Butterflies and Moths of the World Generic Names and their Type-species

Lyonetiidae